is a passenger railway station  located in the town of Hino, Tottori Prefecture, Japan. It is operated by the West Japan Railway Company (JR West).

Lines

Station layout
The station consists of one ground-level island platform connected with the station building by a footbridge. The station is unattended.

Platforms

Adjacent stations

History
Kamisuge Station opened on April 1, 1925. With the privatization of the Japan National Railways (JNR) on April 1, 1987, the station came under the aegis of the West Japan Railway Company.

Passenger statistics
In fiscal 2018, the station was used by an average of 12 passengers daily.

Surrounding area
 Japan National Route 180
 Japan National Route 183

See also
List of railway stations in Japan

References

External links 

 Kamisuge Station from JR-Odekake.net 

Railway stations in Tottori Prefecture
Stations of West Japan Railway Company
Hakubi Line
Railway stations in Japan opened in 1925
Hino, Tottori